All's Well, Ends Well 2011 (Chinese: 最強囍事) is a 2011 Hong Kong romantic comedy film directed by Chan Hing-ka and Janet Chun. It is the sixth instalment in the All's Well, Ends Well film series, was released on 2 February 2011.

Plot
Make-up artist Sammy (Louis Koo) is hired by Dream (Yan Ni) as the director of a cosmetic company with Claire (Cecilia Cheung) being the only colleague who is willing to assist him. Sammy invites Arnold (Donnie Yen), a fellow make-up artist, to join him. Though Arnold might appear to be a woman's magnet, his heart still lingers with his first love Mona (Carina Lau), a frustrated writer. A minor incident in the new product commercial ties the friendship among Sammy, Arnold and the yacht billionaire Syd (Chapman To). Syd meets Claire and aims to pursue her. Having grown up in a poor family, Claire seizes this as a golden opportunity to live a prosperous life and asks Sammy for help to fulfill her dream, without realising that she has fallen in love with Sammy.

Cast

Main cast

Other cast

Release
The film was released on 2 February 2011, which was Chinese New Year Eve.

References

External links

2011 films
2011 romantic comedy films
2010s Cantonese-language films
Hong Kong romantic comedy films
2010s Hong Kong films